The Pakistan women's national baseball team is the national team representing Pakistan in international women's baseball tournaments and competitions.

The team made its Women's Baseball World Cup debut at the 2016 edition in South Korea, and finished 12th overall. The team has competed at both editions of the Women's Baseball Asian Cup, finishing 6th in 2017 and 8th in 2019.

As of January 2023, it is ranked 19th in the world.

Results and fixtures 
The following is a list of professional baseball match results currently active in the latest version of the WBSC World Rankings, as well as any future matches that have been scheduled.

 Legend

2022

See also 

 Pakistan national baseball team
 Pakistan Federation Baseball

References 

Baseball in Pakistan
Pakistan
Baseball